Route 275 or Highway 275 may refer to:

Canada
 Manitoba Provincial Road 275
 New Brunswick Route 275
 Quebec Route 275

India
 National Highway 275 (India)
State Highway 275 (Maharashtra)

Japan
 Japan National Route 275

United States
 Interstate 275 (multiple highways)
 U.S. Route 275
 Alabama State Route 275
 California State Route 275
 Connecticut Route 275
 Florida State Road 275 (former)
 Georgia State Route 275
 Maryland Route 275
 Minnesota State Highway 275
 Montana Secondary Highway 275
 New Mexico State Road 275
 New York State Route 275
 Tennessee State Route 275
 Texas State Highway 275
 Texas State Highway Loop 275
 Farm to Market Road 275 (Texas)
 Utah State Route 275